The Tour de la Mirabelle is a multi-day road cycling race that has been held annually in Lorraine, France since 2002. It has been part of UCI Europe Tour in category 2.2 since 2019.

Winners
Since 2010:

References

Cycle races in France
2002 establishments in France
Recurring sporting events established in 2002
UCI Europe Tour races